Jacob Lawrence Frey (born July 23, 1981) is an American politician and attorney who has served as the mayor of Minneapolis, Minnesota since 2018. A member of the Minnesota Democratic–Farmer–Labor Party, he served on the Minneapolis City Council from 2014 until 2018. He was first elected in 2017 and reelected in 2021.

Early life and education 
Frey grew up in Oakton, Virginia, a suburb of Washington, D.C. His parents were both professional modern ballet dancers; his mother is of Russian Jewish ancestry, and his father converted to Judaism.

After graduating from Oakton High School in Vienna, Virginia, Frey attended the College of William & Mary, where he was a distance runner on the track and field team and all-Colonial Athletic Association (CAA) cross-country runner. Frey won the 2002 CAA 5,000-meter title in track.

Frey graduated from William & Mary in 2004 with a B.A. in government. After graduation, he received a contract from a shoe company to run professionally and competed for Team USA in the 2007 Pan American Games marathon, finishing in fourth place. Frey also pursued a Juris Doctor at the Villanova University School of Law, graduating cum laude in 2009 and giving the student address at commencement.

Career

Early career 
Frey moved to Minneapolis in 2009 after graduating from law school and joined the law firm Faegre & Benson (now Faegre Drinker) to practice employment and civil rights law before moving on to the law firm Halunen & Associates.

Frey has been active in community causes since moving to Minneapolis. After a tornado struck North Minneapolis in 2011, Frey provided legal services to tenants who lost their homes. In late 2011, Frey ran in a special election for an open state senate seat and came in fifth in the party primary. The only candidate he finished ahead of had dropped out of the race before election day.

In 2012, Frey founded and organized the first Big Gay Race, a 5K charity race to raise money for Minnesotans United for All Families, a political group organizing for marriage equality.

Minneapolis City Council 
Frey ran in the 2013 Minneapolis City Council election to represent Ward 3. He received the Democratic–Farmer–Labor endorsement, as well as endorsements from more than 40 elected officials and organizations. Frey's platform promised better constituent services, to spur residential development, increase the number and variety of small and local businesses, and push for full funding of affordable housing and address climate change. He defeated incumbent Diane Hofstede with more than 60% of the vote and took office on January 2, 2014.

As a City Council member, Frey focused on affordable housing, environmental policy, workplace regulations, and voting access. He authored an amendment to the 2015 budget that increased funding for the city's Affordable Housing Trust Fund.

In 2016, Frey authored an ordinance requiring polluters to pay fees based on the amount of pollution they produce. The fees are used to support green business improvements. Since the program's launch, emissions linked to climate change have declined substantially. Frey and the City of Minneapolis were honored at the 2018 U.S. Conference of Mayors for the program's success.

Frey was involved in drafting the council's 2016 paid sick leave ordinance and the 2017 minimum wage ordinance. He was one of the first council members to support a minimum wage ordinance. Frey authored the amendment to the minimum wage ordinance that gave small businesses a longer phase-in than large businesses for implementing the minimum wage.

As chair of the council's Elections Committee, Frey led the effort to pass an ordinance requiring landlords to provide tenants with voter registration information. The ordinance has served as a national model, with cities like Seattle and St. Paul following suit. A federal district court judge later struck down the ordinance as unconstitutional. Frey also led the effort to expand early voting access in Minneapolis ahead of the 2016 election, increasing the number of early voting sites in Minneapolis from one to five.

Mayor of Minneapolis 

Frey announced his candidacy for mayor of Minneapolis on January 3, 2017, and won the November 7 election. He was sworn into office on January 2, 2018.

Frey is Minneapolis's second Jewish mayor, and its second-youngest after Al Hofstede, who was 34 when he was elected mayor in 1973. Frey campaigned on a platform of increasing support for affordable housing and improving police-community relations.

Frey rolled out reforms to the Minneapolis Police Department's body camera policy in April 2018. The changes tied non-compliance to stricter disciplinary consequences for the first time. Following the changes, officer compliance with the body camera policy reached record highs. In 2019, Frey announced during his State of the City address the banning of "warrior" training for police officers, which had been taken by the officer who killed Philando Castile. But Frey has faced protests from community groups for increases to the police department budget and the lack of significant investment in community-led safety alternatives. Axios describes his stance on policing as moderate.

The first budget Frey authored as mayor focused heavily on affordable housing. Its $40 million allocation to affordable housing was triple what the city previously spent on affordable housing.

As mayor, Frey is pushing for a plan that would allow the building of four-plexes in every part of the city. Two-thirds of Minneapolis is zoned exclusively for single-family homes.

In 2018, the Minneapolis City Council voted for Minneapolis 2040, a comprehensive rezoning reform plan. According to Slate, the plan would "permit three-family homes in the city’s residential neighborhoods, abolish parking minimums for all new construction, and allow high-density buildings along transit corridors." Slate wrote that by implementing the plan, "Minneapolis will become the first major U.S. city to end single-family home zoning, a policy that has done as much as any to entrench segregation, high housing costs, and sprawl as the American urban paradigm over the past century."

Frey was reelected with 56.2% of the vote in 2021, defeating challenger Kate Knuth in the final round of ranked-choice voting.

COVID-19 pandemic

On March 16, 2020, Frey issued an order declaring a local emergency in response to the COVID-19 pandemic. Before the order was signed, events such the upcoming St. Patrick's Day parade were canceled. On May 21, 2020, Frey signed an order requiring people over the age of 2 to wear a mask covering over their nose and mouth while at "indoor spaces of public accommodation." On July 29, he issued an emergency order declaring that all Minneapolis indoor bars, which had recently reopened, would close effective August 1. Taprooms, distilleries, nightclubs and restaurants also closed.

George Floyd protests 

On May 27, 2020, after the start of protests sparked by the murder of George Floyd, Frey backed the firing of four police officers involved in the death, saying, "Being black in America should not be a death sentence. For five minutes we watched as a white police officer pressed his knee into the neck of a black man. For five minutes. When you hear someone calling for help, you are supposed to help." The next day, Frey called for criminal charges to be filed against Derek Chauvin, the arresting officer who pressed his knee on Floyd's neck, saying, "We cannot turn a blind eye. It is on us as leaders to see this for what it is and call it what it is. George Floyd deserves justice", and "If you had done it or I had done it, we would be behind bars right now. I cannot come up with a good answer to that question.”

Chauvin was later charged with third-degree murder, which was later upgraded to second-degree murder. On June 5, 2020, Frey approved a temporary restraining order and directed changes to the Minneapolis Police Department that were approved by the Minneapolis City Council to go into effect immediately. Reforms that were given to the Minneapolis Police Department include banning chokeholds and neck restraints, requiring police officers to report and intervene against the use of excessive force by other officers, and requiring authorization from the police chief or deputy police chiefs before using crowd-control weapons such as chemical agents and rubber bullets.

On June 6, 2020, during the George Floyd protests, a march was held in Minneapolis pushing for the abolition of the Minneapolis Police Department. With thousands in attendance, protesters asked Frey, who was wearing a black facemask with the words "I can't breathe" on it, whether he would commit to defunding the Minneapolis Police Department. "We don't want no more police, is this clear?", he was asked. He answered, "I do not support the full abolition of police." Attendees chanted "go home" and "shame" at Frey as he left following his answer.

On April 20, 2021, after Derek Chauvin was found guilty of the murder of George Floyd, Frey released a statement on Twitter in which he implied that Floyd had sacrificed his life for the betterment of the city of Minneapolis. The statement received heavy criticism from people across the country including many who called on Frey to fire his communications staff.

Personal life 
Jacob Frey married his first wife, Michelle Lilienthal, in 2009. They divorced in early 2014.

Frey met his second wife, Sarah Clarke, through community organizing in Minneapolis. The couple married in July 2016. Clarke is a lobbyist for Hylden Advocacy & Law, where she represents several business, nonprofits, and community organizations at the Minnesota legislature and executive branch agencies. In March 2020, the couple announced they were expecting their first child in September. Their daughter Frida Jade Frey was born at 5:22 pm on September 16, 2020, weighing 7 pounds and 10 ounces. In a joint statement, both Frey and Clarke expressed joy in the fact that Frida was born shortly before the Jewish new year holiday of Rosh Hashanah, stating "For us, her birth leading into Rosh Hashanah symbolizes new beginnings and hope in the midst of tough days." The day after Frida's birth, Frey started taking a brief leave of absence from the normal Mayor's office, but would continue to handle day-to-day mayoral duties from his home.

Frey is a Reform Jew and attends a Reform synagogue in Minneapolis, Temple Israel, together with his wife, who converted to Judaism.

See also 
 2020–2021 Minneapolis–Saint Paul racial unrest
List of mayors of the 50 largest cities in the United States

References

External links 

 
 Campaign website
 

1981 births
Living people
21st-century American politicians
American male marathon runners
American people of Russian-Jewish descent
Athletes (track and field) at the 2007 Pan American Games
Jewish American people in Minnesota politics
Jewish mayors of places in the United States
Lawyers from Minneapolis
Mayors of Minneapolis
Minnesota Democrats
Military personnel from Minnesota
Minneapolis City Council members
Oakton High School alumni
Pan American Games track and field athletes for the United States
People from Oakton, Virginia
Villanova University School of Law alumni
William & Mary Tribe men's track and field athletes